Customer service is the assistance and advice provided by a company to those people who buy or use its products or services. Each industry requires different levels of customer service, but towards the end, the idea of a well-performed service is that of increasing revenues. The perception of success of the customer service interactions is dependent on employees "who can adjust themselves to the personality of the customer". Customer service is often practiced in a way that reflects the strategies and values of a firm. Good quality customer service is usually measured through customer retention. Customer service for some firms is part of the firm’s intangible assets and can differentiate it from others in the industry. One good customer service experience can change the entire perception a customer holds towards the organization.

Customer service does not only focus on the external aspect of the organization, but also the internal relations that facilitate the business activity. For service firms, customer service plays a vital role due to the close interaction with clients, like in the healthcare, or legal industries.[2] When close interaction is not required, there are different methods to still provide individuals with a sense of attention. For instance, when withdrawing money from an ATM, or skipping the line in an amusement park. Customers still receive the service they are looking for in a direct level, without face-to-face interaction.

The evolution in the service industry has identified the needs of consumers. Companies usually create policies or standards to guide their personnel to follow their particular service package. A service package is a combination of tangible and intangible characteristics a firm uses to take care of its clients.

Customer support

Customer support is a range of consumer services to assist customers in making cost-effective and correct use of a product. It includes assistance in planning, installation, training, troubleshooting, maintenance, upgrading, and disposal of a product. These services may even be provided at the place in which the customer makes use of the product or service. In this case, it is called "at home customer service" or "at home customer support." Customer support is an effective strategy that ensures that the customer's needs have been taken care of. Customer support helps ensure that the products and services that have been provided to the customer are satisfactory to their expectations. Given an effective and efficient customer support experience, customers tend to be loyal to the organization, which creates a competitive advantage of the organization over its competitors. Organizations should ensure that any complaints from customers about customer support have been dealt with effectively.

Automated customer service
Customer service may be provided in person (e.g. sales / service representative), or by automated means, such as kiosks, websites, and apps. An advantage of automation is that it can provide service 24 hours a day, which can, at least, complement face-to-face customer service. There is also economic benefit to the firm. Through the evolution of technology, automated services become less expensive over time. This helps provide services to more customers for a fraction of the cost of employees' wages. Automation can facilitate customer service or replace it entirely.

A popular type of automated customer service is done through artificial intelligence (AI). The customer benefit of AI is the feel for chatting with a live agent through improved speech technologies while giving customers the self-service benefit.  AI can learn through interaction to give a personalized service. The exchange the Internet of Things (IoT) facilitates within devices, lets us transfer data when we need it, where we need it. Each gadget catches the information it needs while it maintains communication with other devices, and this is also done through advances in technology in both hardware and software. Another form of automated customer service is touch-tone phone, which usually involves IVR (Interactive Voice Response) a main menu and the use of a keypad as options (e.g. "Press 1 for English, Press 2 for Spanish").

In the Internet era, a challenge is, to maintain and/or enhance the personal experience while making use of the efficiencies of online commerce. "Online customers are literally invisible to you (and you to them), so it's easy to shortchange them emotionally. But this lack of visual and tactile presence makes it even more crucial to create a sense of personal, human-to-human connection in the online arena."

Examples of customer service by artificial means are automated online assistants that can be seen as avatars on websites, which enterprises can use to reduce operating and training costs. These are driven by chatbots, and a major underlying technology to such systems is natural language processing.

Adversely, automation has created a need for information that can sometimes harm privacy.

Metrics 
The two main ways of gathering feedback are customer surveys and Net Promoter Score measurement, used for calculating the loyalty that exists between a provider and a consumer.

Instant feedback
Many outfits have implemented feedback loops that allow them to capture feedback at point of experience. For example, National Express in the UK has invited passengers to send text messages while riding the bus. This has been shown to be useful, as it allows companies to improve their customer service before the customer defects, thus making it far more likely that the customer will return next time.

See also 

 Automated attendant
 Customer experience management
 Customer relationship management
 Customer satisfaction
 Customer service representative
 Customer service training
 Demand chain
 Interactive voice response
 Live support software
 Privacy policy
 Professional services automation
 Public Services
 Sales
 Sales process engineering
 Sales territory
 Service climate
 Service system
 Social skills
 Support automation
 Technical support
 Help desk software

References
 

Computer telephony integration 
 
Services marketing
Telephony